Moundball is a side-betting game typically played by spectators at Major League Baseball games. Often played to pass the time during slow games, Moundball has a simple ruleset and requires little to no equipment. The game is turn-based, with the goal of having the ball remain on the mound at the end of a player's half inning turn.

Playing the Game
At the start of the game, each player places their ante into a cup or hat. (The money can also be held in a pocket or hand, or the game can be played with mental IOUs or for simple points.) The game begins in the top of the first inning, with the player closest to the aisle holding the cup for the length of the half inning. Alternately, players may draw numbers or otherwise randomly determine the order.

At the end of the half inning, the player from the fielding team to record the last out will typically throw or roll the ball towards the mound, where the opposing pitcher might easily retrieve it. This is the seminal moment of gameplay, as the ball will usually reach the mound, roll up on the slope of dirt, and roll back towards the grass due to gravity or momentum.

Winning A Turn
Should the ball stay on the dirt of the mound, the player holding the cup is declared the winner, and collects all money in the cup. If the ball should roll back onto the grass, or fail to reach the mound at all, that player has lost the round, and the cup passes to the next player.  The money in the cup carries over, as in a skins game in golf, and each player must add more money to the cup.  If a player is not in his or her seat holding the cup at the time of the winning or losing event, the other players are not obligated to inform him or her of a winning moundball.  It is each player's sole responsibility to pay attention to the moundball results on their own particular turn.

Moving to the Next Turn
Each time the ball stays on the mound, the player whose turn it is to hold the cup wins all of the money contained therein.  Each time the ball does not stay on the mound, the money in the cup increments by one dollar per player.  Either way, the game continues with each player adding a dollar to the cup as the teams switch fields between half innings, and the cup passing to the next player for their turn.  As the moundball players leave their seats periodically to use the restroom or go to the concession stand, it is important to retain the same order of turns to maintain fairness.  At the end of the baseball game, any money remaining in the cup is returned to the players equally.  Some games may be ended early in order to limit the number of turns to a multiple of the number of players - e.g. the game might end after the 8th inning so that four players each had four chances to win over 16 half innings.  Only games consisting of 2, 3 or 6 players naturally result in a fair number of turns over 9 innings (18 half innings), although the baseball tradition of skipping the bottom of the ninth when the home team is ahead can affect fairness in any case.

Rule Variations
In the era since the last MLB strike in 1994, Commissioner Bud Selig has encouraged professional baseball players towards behavior seen as growing fan interest and positive feelings towards the game.  Among the behaviors encouraged in recent years are signing more autographs and tossing more balls into the stands when an inning ends.  This has served to severely depress the number of winning turns in moundball, as a ball thrown into the stands has no chance of remaining on the mound.  To cope with this change, the definition of a potential winning moundball has grown in many cases to include a ball thrown towards the mound by the home plate umpire, thereby replacing a ball thrown into the stands by a player on the fielding team. One other rule variation has been invented by the SUNY Delhi Men's golf team and has become a popular addition to the game. Although rare, there is an off chance that 2 balls will be thrown back to the mound, one by a player and one by the umpire. In the unlikely event that both balls stay on the mound, the holder of the cup will receive double the amount in the cup.

Moundball Strategy
Since players rely on individuals over whom they have no control, there is little possible strategy to moundball once the game begins.  One potential approach is to use prior knowledge to maneuver a turn at the start of the game so the player always holds the cup when a particular team is in the field - a strategy only possible when an even number of players is present.  This might be based on the knowledge that a particular team is less likely to throw the ball in the stands, or that the starting pitcher is a strikeout artist (meaning the ball is likely to end innings in the catcher's glove - the closest player to the mound).  It is also important to note which dugout is assigned to which team, as many balls will end in the first baseman's glove, and the first baseman often must cross the mound area to reach the visitor's dugout.  

Some professional baseball players are also thought to be playing their own version of moundball, meaning that they will put forth an extra effort to get the ball to stay on the mound.  Though this is particularly true of catchers, fielders at other positions have shown outstanding ability as well.  Larry Walker is among the more notable recent players who had a distinct skill at delivering winning moundballs from out in right field.  It could be considered cheating to ask a professional with whom one has a prior relationship to make an extra effort to throw winning moundballs, although that is no guarantee of victory.

Sports betting
Baseball culture